Angamos may refer to:

 , a peninsula near Mejillones, Chile
 Battle of Angamos, a decisive naval battle during the War of the Pacific, fought off Punta Angamos
 Angamos Hill in the South Shetland Islands
 Angamos Island in South Chile
 Angamos, Requena, capital of Yaquerana District, Peru
 Transporter Angamos (1890), a ship of the Chilean Navy, sunk in 1928
 BAP Angamos (SS-31), a submarine of the Peruvian Navy